Garmul was a Berber king of the Mauro-Roman Kingdom. Garmul, who destroyed a Byzantine army in 571, launched raids into Byzantine territory, and three successive generals (the praetorian prefect Theodore and the magister militum Theoctistus in 570, and Theoctistus' successor Amabilis in 571) are recorded by John of Biclaro to have been killed in a battle by Garmul's forces. His activities, especially when regarded together with the simultaneous Visigoth attacks in Spania, presented a clear threat to the province's authorities. Thus the new emperor, Tiberius II Constantine, re-appointed Thomas as praetorian prefect, and the able general Gennadius was posted as magister militum with the clear aim of ending Garmul's campaigns. Preparations were lengthy and careful, but the campaign itself, launched in 577–78, was brief and effective, with Gennadius utilizing terror tactics against Garmul's subjects. Garmul was defeated and killed by 579, and the coastal corridor between Tingitana and Caesariensis secured.

References

578 deaths
Mauretania Caesariensis
6th-century Berber people
6th-century monarchs in Africa
Berber rulers
Monarchs killed in action
Mauro-Roman Kingdom
Monarchs of the Mauro-Roman Kingdom